Marco Antonio Mocenigo was a Roman Catholic prelate who served as Bishop of Ceneda (1586–1598).

Biography
On 5 March 1586, he was appointed during the papacy of Pope Sixtus V as Bishop of Ceneda.
On 12 March 1586, he was consecrated bishop by Decio Azzolini (seniore), Bishop of Cervia, with Pietro Lunello, Bishop of Gaeta, and Giovanni Battista Santorio, Bishop of Tricarico, serving as co-consecrators. 
He served as Bishop of Ceneda until his resignation in 1598 or 1599.

References

External links and additional sources
 (for Chronology of Bishops) 
 (for Chronology of Bishops) 

16th-century Roman Catholic bishops in the Republic of Venice
Bishops appointed by Pope Sixtus V